Alexander John Colquhoun (1868 – 1951) was a farmer and political figure in Saskatchewan, Canada. He represented Maple Creek in the Legislative Assembly of Saskatchewan from 1917 to 1921 as a Liberal.

He was born in Colquhoun, Dundas County, Ontario, the son of Peter Duncan Colquhoun. In 1890, he married Rosamond Mitchell Johnson. Colquhoun lived in Maple Creek, Saskatchewan.

References 

Saskatchewan Liberal Party MLAs
1868 births
1951 deaths
Canadian farmers
People from the United Counties of Stormont, Dundas and Glengarry